The Greenville Red Sox was the name of an American minor league baseball franchise representing Greenville, South Carolina, that played for five seasons, 1967–1971, in the Class A Western Carolinas League.  It played its home games at Meadowbrook Park.

Greenville was represented in the WCL from 1963–1972, taking its nicknames from its various parent organizations. When the New York Mets vacated Greenville after the 1966 season, the Boston Red Sox, seeking to replace the Oneonta Red Sox as its third full-season Class A farm club, took the Mets' place. The Greenville Red Sox produced future Major League Baseball players such as Rick Burleson, Cecil Cooper, Billy Conigliaro, John Curtis, Bo Díaz, Dwight Evans, Mike Garman, Mike Nagy, Don Newhauser, Ben Oglivie and Dick Pole during their five years of existence. Attendance ranged between 41,000 and 59,000 — in the middle to lower tier of WCL franchises of the time.

When Red Sox decided to trim their farm system for  — they had two other full-season Class A affiliates, the Winston-Salem Red Sox and the Winter Haven Red Sox — the Texas Rangers replaced them in Greenville, and renamed the team.

References
 Johnson, Lloyd, and Wolff, Miles, eds., The Encyclopedia of Minor League Baseball, 3d edition. Durham, N.C.: Baseball America, 2007.

External links
  Baseball Reference

Defunct Western Carolinas League teams
Boston Red Sox minor league affiliates
Baseball in Greenville, South Carolina
Sports clubs established in 1967
Sports clubs disestablished in 1971